Perisur (also Centro Comercial Perisur) is a shopping mall located in the Coyoacán borough in southern Mexico City at the intersection of Insurgentes Avenue South and the Anillo Periférico, next to the UNAM main campus in Ciudad Universitaria and to the upscale Jardines del Pedregal neighbourhood. 
Designed by architect Juan Sordo Madaleno, the shopping center became the largest shopping mall in total area in Mexico when it opened in 1980.

Tenants 
 Over 230 retail stores 
 Over a dozen restaurants 
 Over 25 fast food restaurants
 IMAX screen and 19-screen movie theatre Cinépolis. 
 Liverpool department store
 El Palacio de Hierro department store
 Sears department store

Former anchors include París-Londres.

References

Shopping malls in Greater Mexico City
Coyoacán
Shopping malls established in 1980